This list encompasses fictional characters and species who are parasites and/or parasitoids.

A
Alien (sometimes referred to as a xenomorph), parasitoid species that is the primary antagonist of the  Alien franchise
Aparoid

B
Baby (Dragon Ball)
Bellum (The Legend of Zelda)
Bezoar (Buffy the Vampire Slayer)
Biollante
Blackrock (comics)
Brood (comics)
William Birkin

C
Carnage (character)
Ceti eel - creature in the film Star Trek II: The Wrath of Khan, invading the human brain
Chimera Anima - blob-shaped parasitic aliens in manga Tokyo Mew Mew, infecting animals and changing them into monsters

D
Deathspiral Butterfly - parasitoid butterfly in Shadowrun
Destoroyah
DNAlien (Ben 10)

E
Eclipso
Edriss 562

F
Flood (Halo)

G
Goa'uld - the main antagonists in Stargate and Stargate SG-1
Gravemind
 Gregor Samson (Skullgirls)
 Gae Bolga (Skullgirls)

H
Headcrab
Heartless (Kingdom Hearts)
Hedorah

I
Illyria (Angel)
Imhotep (character)

L
Left Hand (Vampire Hunter D)
Lavos
Las Plagas
Leviathan (Skullgirls)

M
Metroid (species)
Metroid Prime (character)
Mummudrai
MUTO

N
Hinako Ninomiya
Nemesis (Resident Evil)
Neurax Worm (Plague Inc.)
Cassandra Nova
N'Tal ("Second Soul", 1995 episode of The Outer Limits)

P
Parallax (comics)
Parasite (comics)
Parasite - 1982 3-D film
The Parasprites, from My Little Pony: Friendship is Magic episode Swarm of the Century.
Pod People (Invasion of the Body Snatchers)
Parasytes (manga)

R
 Regulan bloodworm - mentioned in various episodes of Star Trek, sometimes causing sickness but also medically useful

S
Sublime (Marvel Comics)
Symbiote (comics)
 Silents (Doctor Who)
 Sekhmet (Skullgirls)

T
Thread, filaments of a space-borne spore that devours organic matter in the Dragonriders of Pern
Trill symbiont in Star Trek: Deep Space Nine, a symbiotic life form that gives its host all the memories of its previous hosts

U
Unity (Superman: The Animated Series)

V
Venom (Marvel Comics character) Spider-Man's archenemy from outer space
Visser Three, the main antagonist character in the Animorphs book and television series
Jason Voorhees (See Jason Goes to Hell: The Final Friday)

X
X Parasite

Y
Yeerk, the main antagonist race in book and television series Animorphs

References

 
Parasites